This list includes skateboarders who have competed or will compete at the 2020 Summer Olympics in Tokyo, Japan. There are two skateboarding disciplines, park and street, each contested as a men's event and a women's event.

Men 

Sources:

Women 

Sources:

References 

Skateboarding
Skateboarding at the 2020 Summer Olympics